Sharjah Stadium is a multi-purpose stadium in Sharjah, United Arab Emirates.  It is currently used mostly for football matches and is the home ground of Sharjah FC.  The stadium has a capacity of 18,000.

2019 AFC Asian Cup
Sharjah Stadium hosted six games of the 2019 AFC Asian Cup, including the round of 16 match between Asian powerhouses Japan vs Saudi Arabia.

References

Football venues in the United Arab Emirates
Multi-purpose stadiums in the United Arab Emirates
Sport in Sharjah (city)